Arco di Travertino is a station on Line A of the Rome Metro. It is located in Rome's 9th district, between Colli Albani and Porta Furba stations. It is located under the intersection of Via Arco di Travertino, Via Colli Albani and Largo Lorenzo Cuneo.

References

Rome Metro Line A stations
Railway stations opened in 1980
1980 establishments in Italy
Rome Q. VIII Tuscolano
Railway stations in Italy opened in the 20th century